Muhammad Hatta Rajasa (born 18 December 1953) is an Indonesian politician who served as the Coordinating Minister for the Economy of Indonesia from 22 October 2009 to 13 May 2014. A member of the National Mandate Party (PAN), he previously served as Minister Secretary of State (2007-2009), Minister of Transportation (2004-2007), and Minister of State for Research and Technology (2001- 2004). He was also general Prabowo Subianto's running mate in the 2014 Indonesian presidential election, with the ticket being backed by a number of parties, including the Gerindra party, National Mandate Party, Prosperous Justice Party, United Development Party, the Crescent Star Party and Golkar.

Early life and education

Early life 
Hatta Rajasa born in Palembang, South Sumatra, on 18 December 1953. He was born into a simple family, the second of 13 children. His father was Muhammad Tohir, a man from Jejawi Village, Ogan Komering Ilir, South Sumatra, who was a soldier who later quit and became a civil servant. His mother was a woman named Aisyah, who came from Adumais Village, East Ogan Komering Ulu, South Sumatra, who was housewife.

Education 

 Bandung Technological Institute – Petroleum Engineering

Politics 
He is member of the National Mandate Party (PAN), a moderate Islamic party. Since 2010 he has been chairman of the party.

On May 19, 2014, Hatta registered to run for vice president with Prabowo Subianto running for president in the election on July 9, 2014. The two were supported by 6 parties – PAN, Great Indonesia Movement Party (Gerindra),  Prosperous Justice Party (PKS), United Development Party (PPP), Crescent Star Party (PBB) and Golkar.

Career
2009-2014: Coordinating Minister for Economic Affairs
2004-2009: Minister of Transport (United Indonesia Cabinet)
2001-2004: Minister of Research and Technology (Mutual Assistance Cabinet)
2000-current: Secretary General of National Mandate Party
1999-2000: Chairman of Reformation Faction on People's Representative Council.
1982-2000: President Director Arthindo
1980-1983: Vice-Technical Manager PT. Meta Epsi
1977-1978: Field Technician PT. Bina Patra Jaya

Personal life
Hatta Rajasa is a Palembang Malay. Together, they have a daughter, who is currently married to Edhie "Ibas" Baskoro, the youngest son of former Indonesian president Susilo Bambang Yudhoyono.

Notes

References
 

1953 births
Living people
People from Palembang
Bandung Institute of Technology alumni
Finance Ministers of Indonesia
Indonesian Muslims
Government ministers of Indonesia
National Mandate Party politicians
Indonesian people of Malay descent
Transport ministers of Indonesia